Nick Perry is a journalist who has worked in the U.S. and New Zealand. Since 2011, he has been the Associated Press correspondent for New Zealand and the South Pacific .
He was previously a reporter at The Seattle Times.

He wrote Scoreboard, Baby: A Story of College Football, Crime, and Complicity with Ken Armstrong in 2010.

He was a 2011 Knight-Wallace Fellow at the University of Michigan

Awards
 2011 Knight-Wallace Journalism Fellowship
2011 Edgar Allan Poe Award 
2010 Pulitzer Prize (part of Seattle Times team):
2009 Michael Kelly Award 
2009 Payne Award 
2008 George Polk Award 
2008 Medill Medal Winner finalist

References

External links
 Scoreboard, Baby website

American male journalists
George Polk Award recipients
Year of birth missing (living people)
Living people
New Zealand journalists
University of Michigan fellows